The air quality in Delhi, the capital territory of India, according to a WHO survey of 1,650 world cities, and a survey of 7,000 world cities by the US-based Health Effects Institute in August 2022, is the worst of any major city in the world. It also affects the districts around Delhi. Air pollution  in India is estimated to kill about 2 million people every year; it is the fifth largest killer in India. India has the world's highest death rate from chronic respiratory diseases and asthma, according to the WHO. In Delhi, poor quality air irreversibly damages the lungs of 2.2 million or 50 percent of all children.

On 25 November 2019, the Supreme Court of India made statements on the pollution in Delhi saying "Delhi has become worse than narak (hell)". Supreme Court  Justice Arun Mishra said that it is better to get explosives and kill everyone.

During the COVID-19 pandemic lockdown in India, The water quality of the Yamuna and Ganges river basins have improved as industries are closed due to the lockdown. The air quality has also significantly improved during the lockdown.

India's Ministry of Earth Sciences published a research paper in October 2018 attributing almost 41% to vehicular emissions, 21.5% to dust and 18% to industries. The director of Centre for Science and Environment alleged that the Society of Indian Automobile Manufacturers is lobbying "against the report" because it is "inconvenient" to the automobile industry...

Air quality index of Delhi is generally in the Good (0–50), Satisfactory (51–100), and Moderate (101–200) levels between March to September, and then it drastically deteriorates to Poor (201–300), Severe (301–400), or Hazardous (401–500+) levels during October to February due to various factors including burning of effigies during Vijayadashami, bursting of firecrackers during Diwali, stubble burning, road dust, vehicle pollution and cold weather. In November 2016, in an event known as the Great Smog of Delhi, the air pollution spiked far beyond acceptable levels. Levels of PM2.5 and PM 10 particulate matter hit 999 micrograms per cubic meter, while the safe limits for those pollutants are 60 and 100 respectively. According to Bloomberg, 16.7 lakh people died due to polluted air in India in the year 2019. Further, according to data released by environment ministry in 2022, the Air Quality Index of Delhi National Capital Region is over 200 for at least half the year.

Delhi's pollution problem is also caused by the factor of animal agriculture, as smog and other harmful particles are produced by farmers burning their crops in other states since the 1980s. About 80% of agriculturally used land is used for animal agriculture, so animal agriculture can also be attributed as a factor in Delhi's air pollution problem. Initiatives such as a 1,600km long and 5km wide The Great Green Wall of Aravalli green ecological corridor along Aravalli Range from Gujarat to Delhi which will also connect to the Sivalik Hills range is being considered with planting of 1.35 billion (135 crores) new native trees over 10 years to combat the pollution. In December 2019, IIT Bombay, in partnership with the McKelvey School of Engineering of Washington University in St. Louis, launched the Aerosol and Air Quality Research Facility to study air pollution in India.

On 15 November 2021, Delhi's air quality saw marginal improvement as it reached the lower end of the "severe" category with AQI at 318, according to the System of Air Quality and Weather Forecasting And Research. Delhi CM, Arvind Kejriwal had announced to shut all the schools along with government offices for a week due to the severe air pollution. The AAP government told the Supreme court that they are confident and prepared for a complete lockdown. The Supreme Court asked the centre and states of the NCR region to consider remote work policies for the employees. When the air quality of Delhi on 18 November 2021 slipped to the "severe" category with the AQI at 362, the Supreme Court of India reprimanded the central and state governments asking them to take strict measures to reduce pollution in Delhi and NCR regions.

On 19 November 2021, NASA released a report on the issue of pollution in Delhi.

Particulate matter levels in Delhi
Air quality or ambient/outdoor air pollution is represented by the annual mean concentration of particulate matter PM10 (particles smaller than 10 microns) and PM2.5 (particles smaller than 2.5 microns, about 25 to 100 times thinner than a human hair).

PM10 levels, for the period 2008 and 2013, based on data of 1600 cities in 91 countries, range from 26 to 208 micrograms per cubic meter of air (μg/m3), with the world average being 71 μg/m3. 13 of the 25 cities worldwide with the highest levels of PM are in India.

In 2010, the year of the WHO survey, the average PM10 level in Delhi was 286 μg/m3. In 2013, the PM2.5 level was 153 μg/m3. These levels are considered very unhealthy.  In Gwalior, the city with the worst air quality in India, the PM10 and PM2.5 levels were 329 μg/m3 and 144 μg/m3 respectively. For comparison, the PM10 and PM2.5 levels in London were 22 μg/m3 and 16 μg/m3 respectively.   The PM levels in Delhi have become worse since the WHO survey. In December–January 2015, in Delhi, an average PM2.5 level of 226 μg/m3 was noted by US embassy monitors in Delhi. The average in Beijing for the same period was 95. Delhi's air is twice as bad as Beijing's air. As of October 2017, experts in several monitoring stations have reportedly measured an air quality index of 999. According to said experts this is the equivalent of smoking 45 to 50 cigarettes a day. This has led to some government officials, such as Arvind Kejriwal calling the nation's capital a "gas chamber".

Safe levels for PM according to the WHO's air quality guidelines are 20 μg/m3 (annual mean) for PM10 and 10 μg/m3 (annual mean) for PM2.5.

Causes of poor air quality

 Motor vehicle emissions are one of the causes of poor air quality. Other causes include wood-burning fires, cow dung cake combustion, fires on agricultural land, exhaust from diesel generators, dust from construction sites, burning garbage and illegal industrial activities in Delhi. Although pollution is at its worst from November to February, Delhi's air misses clean-air standards by a wide margin for much of the year. It is a noxious mix of emissions from its 9 million vehicles, construction dust and burning of waste. On the worst days, the air quality index, a benchmark ranging from zero (good) to 500 (hazardous), exceeds 400.
 The Badarpur Thermal Power Station, a coal-fired power plant built in 1973, was another major source of air pollution in Delhi. Despite producing less than 8% of the city's electric power, it produced 80 to 90% of the particulate matter pollution from the electric power sector in Delhi. During the Great smog of Delhi in November 2016, the Badarpur Power Plant was temporarily shut down to alleviate the acute air pollution but was allowed to restart on 1 February 2017. In view of the detrimental effect to the environment, the power plant has been permanently shut down since 15 October 2018 
The drift/mist emissions from the wet cooling towers are also a source of particulate matter as they are widely used in industry and other sectors for dissipating heat in cooling systems.
 Although Delhi is kerosene free and 90% of the households use LPG for cooking, the remaining 10% uses wood, crop residue, cow dung, and coal for cooking. (Census-India, 2011)
 Fire in Bhalswa landfill is a major reason for airborne particles in Delhi.
 Burning of effigies during Vijayadashami and bursting of firecrackers during Diwali.
 Agricultural stubble burning in Haryana and Punjab, coupled with north-westerly winds also affects Delhi's air quality since the 1980s when crops are being harvested. This is the biggest cause  of air pollution in Delhi and as can be seen from air pollution index data, the air quality drastically deteriorated in October, the season of crop burning in Punjab and Haryana. During the crop-burning season, the practice can account for up to 45% of Delhi's pollution, according to government meteorologists.

A study in 2016 measured the sources and average levels of various types of air pollution in Delhi. Of PM2.5 pollution, 38% came from road dust, 20% to vehicles, 12% to domestic fuel burning, and 11% to industrial point sources. Of PM10 pollution, 56% came from road dust, 10% from concrete batching, 10% from industrial point sources, and 9% from vehicles. Of NOx emissions, 52% came from industrial point sources (mostly from power plants and 36% from vehicles (but the 36% was potentially more damaging due to being emitted close to people). Of SO2 emissions, 90% came from industrial point sources. Of CO emissions, 83% came from vehicles. The large contributions of vehicles and road dust to air pollution have been made worse by court-ordered restrictions on bus service in Delhi, which had the effect of accelerating the purchase of private cars and the construction of roads to accommodate them.

Air quality index data of Delhi

Effects of poor air quality

Effects on children 
2.2 million children in Delhi have irreversible lung damage due to the poor quality of the air. In addition, research shows that pollution can lower children's immune system and increase the risks of cancer, epilepsy, diabetes and even adult-onset diseases like multiple sclerosis. Children are more vulnerable to the negative effects of air pollution as they are growing and developing which means that they breathe a higher rate of air per kilogram of their body weight. They also spend more time outside and are thus more exposed to it.

Effects on adults
Poor air quality is a cause of reduced lung capacity, headaches, sore throats, coughs, fatigue, lung cancer, and early death. During the ongoing COVID-19 pandemic, in case the particulate matter (≤ pp10) is not controlled, the aerosols would work as virus carriers/host in the rapid spread of the pandemic.

Smog in Delhi 

Smog in Delhi is an ongoing severe air-pollution event in New Delhi and adjoining areas in the National Capital Territory of India. Air pollution in 2016 peaked on both PM 2.5 and PM 10 levels. It has been reported as one of the worst levels of air quality in Delhi since 1980.

Low visibility has resulted in accidents across the city, notably a 24 vehicle pile-up on the Yamuna Expressway.

"The Great Smog" also led to cancellation and delay of public transport, primarily trains and flights, causing many hindrances to the people.

Background

 Source of pollution

The current majority of analysis sources are hinting towards colder weather, stagnant winds trapping the various sources of smoke. The primary sources of smoke are stubble burning, lit garbage, road dust, power plants, factories, and vehicles.

Air quality can be measured by the amount of PM 2.5 and PM 10 particulates suspended in the air. On 7 November 2016 the PM 2.5 levels in Delhi shot up to a high 999, much above the recommended 60 micrograms. At the same time, PM 10 shot to 999 (the maximum level for the monitors), instead of the recommended limit of 100.

Again on 8 November 2016 the PM 2.5 levels shot up to 449. At the same time PM 10 shot to 663.

 Weather

Incident 
During the second day of the third test of Sri Lankan cricket team in India in 2017-18 at Delhi, smog forced Sri Lanka cricketers to stop playing and wear anti-pollution masks. Cricketer Lahiru Gamage reported to have shortness of breath. Nic Pothas, coach of Sri Lankan cricket team, reported that cricketer Suranga Lakmal had vomited regularly due to severe pollution effect on the Delhi ground. There was a halt of play between 12:32 pm to 12:49 pm which caused Indian coach Ravi Shastri to come out aggressively and have a talk with the field umpire David Boon.

State reaction 
A Health Emergency was declared in the capital by the Central Government of India to cope with the extrusive amount of polluted air. The day was declared as a holiday for schools, offices and other government centres.

Effects

 Health effects

The government of Delhi has declared a health advisory.
 Breathlessness
 Chest constriction 
 Irritation in eyes
 Asthma
 Allergy

Control measures
In 2016, the Chief Minister of Delhi, Arvind Kejriwal, proposed these measures to reduce air pollution but didn't get any success due to the lack of implementation in reality. The efficacy of any individual step has been a matter of public debate.

 All Delhi schools will remain shut for the next few days.
 For the next five days, no construction and demolition work will take place in Delhi.
 All diesel generator sets have been banned for the next ten days, except at hospitals and in emergencies.
 The Delhi government will supply power to unauthorized colonies which use diesel generators.
 The coal-based Badarpur power plant will be shut down for ten days. There will be no-fly ash transportation from the power plant.
 The Environment Department will launch an app to monitor the burning of leaves.
 Vacuum cleaning of roads will start on 10 November.
 Water sprinkling will start on all roads from the next following days.
 People should stay at home as much as they can and they should try working from home.
 As per Faster Adoption and Manufacturing of Electric Vehicles in India scheme it is expected by 2030 all vehicles will be Battery electric and Hybrid
 All combustion engined vehicles will be upgraded to BS6 emission standards
 Any vehicle older than 10–15 years or below BS6 emissions will be banned
 Smog towers will be installed in the city to purify and clean the air
 The Pusa Bio-decomposer will help farmers harvest crops to prevent stubble burning.
 By 2021, the entire Delhi Metro is expected to be 100% powered by solar energy
 In 2022, the Punjab Government announced they will purchase maize, sorghum, pearl millet, sunflower and mung bean crops at MSP, encouraging farmers to adopt less water consuming options as a sustainable alternative to paddy and wheat in the wake of fast-depleting groundwater.

In October 2020, Delhi authorities established a 10-member air pollution control team working in a dedicated conference room. They examine complaints received through the "Green Delhi" mobile app. As of 2020, they also regulate construction dust and ban diesel generators. Air pollution is an issue of special concern during the COVID-19 pandemic because the virus can damage people's lungs and make them less able to cope with pollution.

Longer term measures
On 25 November 2017, the Supreme Court of India banned the sale of firecrackers in Delhi to alleviate pollution.

In another measure, the extremely polluting Badarpur power plant was permanently shut down on 15 October 2018. Recently in October, 2020 union environment ministry has formed a commission for Air Quality Management in National capital region and Adjoining Area Ordinance.

Air quality monitoring stations

The Indian Meteorological Department has air quality monitoring stations in Mathura Road, Delhi (Jor Bagh area), IGI Airport, IITM Delhi, Guru Teg Bahadur Hospital (Ghaziabad area), Dhirpur, Delhi Technological University, Pitampura, Shaheed Sukhdev College of Business Studies (Rohini), Aya Nagar (Gurgaon), and Noida. The air pollution monitor of the U.S. Embassy in New Delhi covers the area of Chanakyapuri.

Response of expatriates and government
To contend with the poor air quality, embassies and international businesses in Delhi are considering reducing staff tenures, advising staff to reconsider bringing their children to Delhi, providing high-end air purifiers, and installing expensive air purifiers in their offices.

On 14 November 2021 the air quality index of Delhi reached 465 and in response to the severe air quality index, the Delhi government announced the closure of all educational institutions for a week from November 15 after the Supreme Court raised concerns over the deteriorating air quality index. On 17 November as the was no improvement on the condition of the air quality index in Delhi. The Commission for Air Quality Monitoring (CAQM) directed that all schools, colleges and educational institutions will be closed until further notice, in Delhi and in NCR. Other than this the entries of trucks have been banned in Delhi, all construction activities have been halted until 21 November 2021 and 6 out of 11 thermal power plants in Delhi in a radius of 300 km have been shut down until 30 November, in an effort to reduce pollution and improve the air quality index.

The Delhi government said that to control the pollution in Delhi they will also be adding 1000 extra CNG buses will be implemented. The Civil Defense Unit will also be checking the registrations and pollution certificates of the cars randomly to curb the pollution. Diesel cars above 10 years and Petrol cars about 15 years are banned in Delhi due to the pollution they cause.

The Supreme Court of India also suggested that government officers living in government colonies should either commute by car pooling together or by public transport.

On 18 November Uttar Pradesh Pollution Control Board announced that schools will no longer be closed due to air pollution in Noida and Ghaziabad.

In view of pollution, the demand for air purifiers has increased significantly in Delhi-NCR. According to the available data, out of the total sales in the country, 70% of the demand is coming from Delhi-NCR. However, companies say that the demand for air purifiers has increased from other parts of the country as well.

The Delhi Government on 27 November 2021, banned the entry of commercial petrol and diesel vehicles in Delhi in view of the increasing pollution in Delhi.

Major incidents 
In December 2017 during a test match between Sri Lankan and Indian cricket teams in New Delhi, Sri Lanka players began to feel breathing problems and several players vomited both in the restrooms and in the field and had to use face masks until the match was stopped. 
In the opinion of the Indian Medical Association president the match should never have taken place and the ICC should have a policy on pollution.

See also

 Criteria air pollutants
 Air pollutant concentrations
 Emission standard
 Environmental issues in Delhi
List of most polluted cities by particulate matter concentration
Air quality index
Haze
Wet cooling tower

References

Further reading
 Cherni, Judith A. Economic Growth versus the Environment: The Politics of Wealth, Health and Air Pollution (2002) online
 Currie, Donya. "WHO: Air Pollution a Continuing Health Threat in World's Cities," The Nation's Health (February 2012) 42#1 online
 Amann, M., Purohit, P., Bertok, I., Bhandarkar, A.D., Borken-Kleefeld, J., Cofala, J., Harshvardhan, B., Heyes, C., Kiesewetter, G., Klimont, Z., Jun, L., Majumdar, D., Ngyuen, B., Rafaj, P., Rao., P.S., Sander, R., Schöpp, W., Shrivastava, A. 2017. Managing future air quality in megacities: A case study for Delhi. Atmospheric Environment, 161: 99–111. 
 Bhandarkar, A.D., Purohit, P., Rafaj, P., Amann, M. et al. 2018. Managing future air quality in megacities: Co-benefit assessment for Delhi, Atmospheric Environment, DOI: https://doi.org/10.1016/j.atmosenv.2018.05.026
 Bhalla, N., O'Boyle, J., & Haun, D. (2019). Who is responsible for Delhi air pollution? Indian newspapers' framing of causes and solutions. International Journal of Communication, 13, 24.

External links

 Air Quality Public Advisory 
 Global real-time air quality index map
 International Conference on Urban Air Quality .
 Database: outdoor air pollution in cities from the World Health Organization
 World Health Organization Fact Sheet on Air quality and health
Impact assessment of the mortality effects of longer-term exposure to air pollution: exploring cause-specific mortality and susceptibility by BG Miller. Institute of Occupational Medicine Research Report TM/03/01
Inflating Air Pollution in Delhi
 Dr AS Soin on Delhi Air Emergency Opentalk Arvinder Singh Soin Opentalk with Sumit Jain
Delhi Air Quality Image Collections

Social issues in India
Air pollution in India
New Delhi
Environment of Delhi
Smog events